The following is a list of current presidents of the regional councils of France and the Corsican Assembly.

List
Since 2011, the Departmental Council of Mayotte has simultaneously exercised the competencies of a regional council. 

Since 2015, the Regional Council of Martinique and the Regional Council of French Guiana have been merged with their respective departmental councils to form a single territorial structure of governance.

List

Summary

By party

By sex

Historic presidents

Current regions

Regional Council of Auvergne-Rhône-Alpes

Regional Council of Brittany

Regional Council of Bourgogne-Franche-Comté

Regional Council of Centre-Val de Loire

Regional Council of Grand Est

Regional Council of Guadeloupe

Regional Council of Hauts-de-France

Regional Council of Île-de-France

Regional Council of Normandy

Regional Council of Nouvelle-Aquitaine

Regional Council of Occitania

Regional Council of Pays de la Loire

Regional Council of Provence-Alpes-Côte d'Azur

Regional Council of Réunion

Collectivities

Corsica

Regional Council of Corsica (1974—1982)

Corsican Assembly (since 1982)

Executive Council of Corsica (since 1992)

French Guiana

Regional Council of French Guiana (1974—2015)

Assembly of French Guiana (since 2015)

Martinique

Regional Council of Martinique (1974—2015)

Assembly of Martinique (since 2015)

Executive Council of Martinique (since 2015)

Mayotte

Departmental Council of Mayotte

Former regions

Regional Council of Alsace

Regional Council of Auvergne

Regional Council of Aquitaine

Regional Council of Burgundy

Regional Council of Champagne-Ardenne

Regional Council of Franche-Comté

Regional Council of Languedoc-Roussillon

Regional Council of Limousin

Regional Council of Lorraine

Regional Council of Midi-Pyrénées

Regional Council of Nord-Pas-de-Calais

Regional Council of Basse-Normandy

Regional Council of Haute-Normandy

Regional Council of Picardy

Regional Council of Poitou-Charentes

Regional Council of Rhône-Alpes

See also
 Politics of France
 Regions of France
 Regional council (France)

External links
Rulers.org
Worldstatesmen.org

Local politicians in France

France